Madison is a city in Lac qui Parle County, Minnesota, United States, along the 45th parallel. The population was 1,518 at the 2020 census.  It is the county seat of Lac qui Parle County. It proclaims itself to be the "lutefisk capital of the USA."

History
Madison was platted in 1884, and named after Madison, Wisconsin. A post office has been in operation at Madison since 1884.

The Madison City Council proposed that the city should be named the Lutefisk Capital of the United States in 1982, and the Madison Chamber of Commerce funded the construction of a  fiberglass cod nicknamed Lou T. Fisk, which welcomes visitors.

Geography

U.S. Highway 75 and Minnesota State Highway 40 are two of the main routes in the city.

Demographics

2010 census
As of the census of 2010, there were 1,551 people, 736 households, and 404 families living in the city. The racial makeup of the city was 96.6% White, 0.1% African American, 0.6% Native American, 0.9% Asian, 0.1% from other races, and 1.6% from two or more races. Hispanic or Latino of any race were 1.5% of the population.

There were 736 households, of which 17.9% had children under the age of 18 living with them, 45.2% were married couples living together, 7.2% had a female householder with no husband present, 2.4% had a male householder with no wife present, and 45.1% were non-families. 41.6% of all households were made up of individuals, and 28.4% had someone living alone who was 65 years of age or older. The average household size was 1.99 and the average family size was 2.68.

The median age in the city was 54.6 years. 17% of residents were under the age of 18; 4.9% were between the ages of 18 and 24; 15.3% were from 25 to 44; 27.1% were from 45 to 64; and 35.7% were 65 years of age or older. The gender makeup of the city was 46.0% male and 54.0% female.

2000 census
As of the census of 2000, there were 1,768 people, 789 households, and 462 families living in the city. The racial makeup of the city was 99.21% White, 0.06% African American, 0.23% Asian, and 0.51% from two or more races. Hispanic or Latino of any race were 0.06% of the population.

There were 789 households, out of which 21.7% had children under the age of 18 living with them, 48.9% were married couples living together, 6.0% had a female householder with no husband present, and 41.4% were non-families. 39.0% of all households were made up of individuals, and 28.0% had someone living alone who was 65 years of age or older.  The average household size was 2.07 and the average family size was 2.75.

In the city, the population was spread out, with 19.1% under the age of 18, 5.1% from 18 to 24, 17.9% from 25 to 44, 22.1% from 45 to 64, and 35.9% who were 65 years of age or older.  The median age was 51 years. For every 100 females, there were 80.0 males.  For every 100 females age 18 and over, there were 77.1 males.

The median income for a household in the city was $27,102, and the median income for a family was $38,008. Males had a median income of $27,903 versus $20,694 for females. The per capita income for the city was $17,435.  About 3.7% of families and 7.8% of the population were below the poverty line, including 5.1% of those under age 18 and 11.7% of those age 65 or over.

Politics

Education
Madison Public Schools are part of the Lac Qui Parle Valley School District. Schools in the district include MMN Elementary School, Appleton Elementary School, LqPV Middle School and Lac qui Parle Valley High School.

MMN Elementary School is located in Madison, LqPV Middle School and LqPV High School are located in rural Madison, and Appleton Elementary School is located in Appleton.

Renae Tostenson is the Superintendent of Schools.

Media
Since January 31, 1983, KLQP-FM known as "Q92" has been serving a five-county area from studios in Madison.

Notable people
 Robert Bly - Poet, activist and author of Iron John: A Book About Men (1990).
 Carol Bly (1930–2007) - Award-winning author of short stories, essays and nonfiction.
 Alvin O. Hofstad (1905-1962), farmer and Minnesota state legislator

In popular culture
In 2004, the American independent film Sweet Land was filmed partially in Madison.  The film was released in 2005.

References

External links

Madison, MN – Business, Community, and Visitor Information site

Cities in Minnesota
Cities in Lac qui Parle County, Minnesota
County seats in Minnesota